Ust-Sema (Sebi-Oozı) is a rural locality (a selo) in Cheposhskoye Rural Settlement of Chemalsky District, the Altai Republic, Russia. The population was 402 as of 2016. There are 15 streets.

Geography 
Ust-Sema is located on the right bank of the Katun River, 37 km northwest of Chemal (the district's administrative centre) by road. Verkh Barangol is the nearest rural locality.

References 

Rural localities in Chemalsky District